In enzymology, a N,N-dimethylformamidase is an enzyme that catalyzes the chemical reaction

N,N-dimethylformamide + H2O  dimethylamine + formate

Thus, the two substrates of this enzyme are N,N-dimethylformamide and H2O, whereas its two products are dimethylamine and formate.

This enzyme belongs to the family of hydrolases, those acting on carbon-nitrogen bonds other than peptide bonds, specifically in linear amides.  The systematic name of this enzyme class is N,N-dimethylformamide amidohydrolase. Other names in common use include dimethylformamidase, and DMFase.  This enzyme participates in glyoxylate and dicarboxylate metabolism.  It employs one cofactor, iron.

References

 

EC 3.5.1
Iron enzymes
Enzymes of unknown structure